Butter catfish is a term for certain catfishes, which look similar but are not particularly closely related:

 Schilbe or butter catfishes, a genus native to Africa
 African butter catfish (Schilbe mystus)
 Ompok bimaculatus or butter catfish, native to parts of Asia

See also 
 Butter (disambiguation)